André Méric (14 August 191314 August 1993) was a French politician who was Senator of Haute-Garonne from 1948 to 1988, and president of the Socialist group in the Senate from 1980 to 1988.

Biography
Méric was born in Toulouse (Haute-Garonne) on 14 August 1913. He became a militant socialist at the age of 15. An apprentice mechanic, Méric desired to become an accountant, qualifying on the eve of his departure for military service in 1939. After the armistice, he joined the Resistance, but was arrested and deported to the camp of Rava-Ruska, in East Prussia. After the Liberation, he was elected to the General Council of Haute-Garonne and became, three years later, the youngest senator of France at thirty-five years. He was also elected mayor of Calmont in 1955.

Vice-President of the Council of the Republic and the Senate from 1956 to 1980, he replaced Alain Poher at the head of the Upper House in 1969 when he became interim President of the Republic. In 1980, the socialist senators chose to chair the group. The following year, Andre Meric is part of the political council of the Socialist Party nominee in Presidential election, François Mitterrand.

In 1987, he was appointed Vice-Chairman of the committee to review the draft resolution on the indictment before the High Court of Justice of Christian Nucci, former Under-Minister for Co-operation and Development. In 1988, he joined the second Rocard government as Secretary of State for Veterans and War Victims and passed a special status for the prisoners of the Viet Minh during the Indochina War. In 1991, he announced his retirement from politics.

Death 
Méric died on 12 August 1993 in a car accident. He was traveling to an event in Calmont celebrating his 80th birthday. 

Following his death, Méric's son Georges succeeded him in the General Council, and later became president of the council's socialist party in 2015.

|-

|-

|-

|-

|-

References

1913 births
1993 deaths
Politicians from Toulouse
Secretaries of State of France
Chevaliers of the Légion d'honneur
Socialist Party (France) politicians
French Senators of the Fourth Republic
French Senators of the Fifth Republic
Senators of Haute-Garonne
Mayors of places in Occitania (administrative region)
Road incident deaths in France